Pantops is a census-designated place in Albemarle County, Virginia.

Geography 
It is a suburban area located just across the Rivanna River east of Charlottesville, and includes Pantops Mountain.

Demographics 

The population as of the 2010 Census was 3,027.

References

Census-designated places in Albemarle County, Virginia
Census-designated places in Virginia